Dragan Jovanović (29 September 1903 – 2 June 1936) was a Serbian and Yugoslav football forward and later manager.

Jovanović was a right wing forward and is remembered as one of the best strikers in Yugoslav football in the 1920s. He spent his whole playing career at SK Jugoslavija of Belgrade. He appeared in a total of 252 official games and scored 331 goals for the club, becoming the best all-time scorer for the club. He was part of the squad that won the 1924 and 1925 Yugoslav championships, and in 1923, 1924 and 1925 he was the Yugoslav championship top scorer. He was nicknamed "Žena" and he later became SK Jugoslavija´s coach, after the departure of Austrian manager Johann Strnad.

Between 1923 and 1928 Jovanović also played for Yugoslavia national football team. He debuted on 28 October 1923 against Czechoslovakia in Prague and scored 2 goals in the game which eventually ended in a 4–4 draw. His last game for the national team was on 7 October 1928, also against Czechoslovakia, when Yugoslavia took a 1–7 beating.

He retired from football still in his twenties and served as SK Jugoslavija club secretary and the chairman of the club's football section. In 1936 he was killed in a car accident on Nemanjina Street in Belgrade.

Honours
 Kingdom of Yugoslavia championship (2): 1924, 1925
 Yugoslav championship top scorer: 1923, 1924, 1925

References

External links
 Dragan Jovanović at Reprezentacija.rs 

1903 births
1936 deaths
Footballers from Belgrade
Yugoslav footballers
Yugoslavia international footballers
Olympic footballers of Yugoslavia
Footballers at the 1924 Summer Olympics
Serbian footballers
SK Jugoslavija players
Yugoslav First League players
Association football forwards
Yugoslav football managers
Serbian football managers
SK Jugoslavija managers
Road incident deaths in Yugoslavia
Road incident deaths in Serbia